Mount McConnel National Recreation Trail is a hiking trail in the Cache La Poudre Wilderness of Roosevelt National Forest west of Fort Collins, Colorado.  The trail leading from Fort Collins Mountain Park to the summit of Mount McConnel was constructed by the Civilian Conservation Corps in 1936. Designation as a National Recreation Trail was in 1981.

References

Protected areas of Larimer County, Colorado
National Recreation Trails in Colorado
Roosevelt National Forest
Civilian Conservation Corps in Colorado